William O'Dwyer (July 11, 1890November 24, 1964) was an Irish-American politician who served as the 100th Mayor of New York City, holding that office from 1946 to 1950. O'Dwyer went on to serve President Harry Truman as Ambassador to Mexico from 1950-1952. O'Dwyer began his political career by serving as the Kings County District Attorney from 1940-45. His brother Paul O'Dwyer served as President of the City Council from 1973-77, and his nephew Brian O'Dwyer was appointed by Governor Kathy Hochul as New York State Gaming Commission Chair in 2022.

Life and career
O'Dwyer was born in Bohola, County Mayo, Ireland and studied at St. Nathys College, Ballaghaderreen, County Roscommon.  In 1907, O'Dwyer began to study for the priesthood at the Pontifical University of Salamanca, a Jesuit seminary in Spain, where he became fluent in Spanish.  He later decided not to join the clergy, and emigrated to the United States in 1910. He sailed to New York as a steerage passenger on board the liner Philadelphia and was inspected at Ellis Island on June 27, 1910. He first worked as a laborer, then as a New York City police officer, while studying law at night at Fordham University Law School. He received his degree in 1923 and then built up a successful practice before serving as a Kings County (Brooklyn) Court judge. He won election as the Kings County District Attorney in November 1939 and his prosecution of the organized crime syndicate known as Murder, Inc. made him a national celebrity.

After losing the mayoral election to Fiorello La Guardia in 1941, O'Dwyer joined the United States Army for World War II, achieving the rank of brigadier general as a member of the Allied Commission for Italy and executive director of the War Refugee Board, for which he received the Legion of Merit. During that time, he was on leave from his elected position as district attorney and replaced by his chief assistant, Thomas Cradock Hughes, and was re-elected in November 1943.

In 1945, O'Dwyer received the support of Tammany Hall leader Edward V. Loughlin, won the Democratic nomination, and then easily won the mayoral election. At his inauguration, O'Dwyer celebrated to the song, "It's a Great Day for the Irish", and addressed the 700 people gathered in Council Chambers at City Hall: "It is our high purpose to devote our whole time, our whole energy to do good work...." He established the Office of City Construction Coordinator, appointing Park Commissioner Robert Moses to the post, worked to have the permanent home of the United Nations located in Manhattan, presided over the first billion-dollar New York City budget, created a traffic department and raised the subway fare from five cents to ten cents. In 1948, O'Dwyer received The Hundred Year Association of New York's Gold Medal Award "in recognition of outstanding contributions to the City of New York." In 1948, he received the epithets "Whirling Willie" and "Flip-Flop Willie" from U.S. Representative Vito Marcantonio of the opposition American Labor Party while the latter was campaigning for Henry A. Wallace.

Shortly after his re-election to the mayoralty in 1949, O'Dwyer was confronted with a police corruption scandal uncovered by the Kings County District Attorney, Miles McDonald. O'Dwyer resigned from office on August 31, 1950. Upon his resignation, he was given a ticker tape parade up Broadway's Canyon of Heroes in the borough of Manhattan. President Harry Truman appointed him U.S. Ambassador to Mexico. He returned to New York City in 1951 to answer questions concerning his association with organized crime figures and the accusations followed him for the rest of his life. He resigned as ambassador on December 6, 1952, but remained in Mexico until 1960.

He helped organize the first Israel Day Parade, along with New York's Jewish community.

Death
O'Dwyer died in New York City on November 24, 1964, in Beth Israel Hospital, aged 74, from heart failure. His funeral mass was held at St. Patrick's Cathedral on November 27, and he was interred at Arlington National Cemetery, Section 2, Grave 889-A-RH.

Family
In 1916, O'Dwyer married Catherine Lenihan, whom he met while he was working as a bartender at the Vanderbilt Hotel and she was employed as one of the Vanderbilt's telephone switchboard operators.  They had no children, and she was in ill health for many years before her death in 1946.  Her funeral was originally planned for St. Joseph's Church in the Yorkville neighborhood of Manhattan, where she and her husband were members.  The large number of attendees resulted in a move to St. Patrick's Cathedral, where the service was presided over by Cardinal Francis Spellman.

On December 20, 1949, O'Dwyer married Elizabeth Sloan Simpson at St. Joseph's Catholic Church in Stuart, Florida.  They divorced in 1953, but remained close, and Simpson attended O'Dwyer's funeral in 1964.

See also
List of mayors of New York City
New York City tugboat strike of 1946

References

External links

Arlington National Cemetery

 

 
 

 
 

1890 births
1964 deaths
20th-century Irish people
People from County Mayo
Ambassadors of the United States to Mexico
United States Army personnel of World War II
American Roman Catholics
Burials at Arlington National Cemetery
Kings County District Attorneys
Irish emigrants to the United States (before 1923)
Mayors of New York City
New York (state) Democrats
New York (state) lawyers
People with acquired American citizenship
United States Army generals
20th-century American politicians
20th-century American lawyers